Whitegrove Copse is a   Local Nature Reserve on the northern outskirts of Bracknell in Berkshire. It is owned and managed by Bracknell Forest Borough Council.

This site is ancient coppiced woodland.

History

Whitegrove Copse has been wooded since at least 1600. The wood was part of the Holly Spring Estate infrastructure, providing wood and cover for deer. As part of the Holly Spring estate the site was owned in its last few years by the Sheppee family and the copse provided cover for pheasant shoots along with wood for fire logs and pea sticks within the gardens.

In the 1990s large areas of the land surrounding Whitegrove Copse was developed for housing, and the copse was retained as a public open space and managed by Bracknell Forest Borough Council from 1996.

In 2002 the site was declared as a local nature reserve by Bracknell Forest Borough Council.

Fauna

The site has the following fauna:

Invertebrates

Speckled wood
Holly blue
Dark bush-cricket

Birds

Eurasian blackcap
Common chiffchaff
Coal tit
Goldcrest
Song thrush
European green woodpecker
Pyrrhula pyrrhula

Flora

The site has the following flora:

Trees

Douglas fir
Scots pine
Corylus avellana
Malus sylvestris
Quercus cerris
Platanus orientalis
Sorbus torminalis
Sorbus aucuparia
Sambucus nigra
Crataegus
Betula pendula
Populus tremula
Ilex aquifolium
Ulmus laevis

Plants

Lychnis flos-cuculi
Hyacinthoides non-scripta

References

Local Nature Reserves in Berkshire
Warfield